Vihuri may refer to:

 1478 Vihuri, an asteroid
 Finnish motor torpedo boat Vihuri
 Ida Vihuri (1882–1929), Finnish politician
 Valmet Vihuri, a Finnish military aircraft